Forest Lawn Cemetery (Cathedral City), renamed from Palm Springs Mortuary & Mausoleum in 2005, is a mausoleum in Cathedral City, California near Palm Springs. It is operated by Forest Lawn Memorial-Parks & Mortuaries.

Notable interments
Among those interred here are:
 Elisabeth Brooks, also known as Elisabeth Brooks Luytes (1951–1997), actress
 Shirley Burkovich (1933–2022), baseball player
 John Conte (1915–2006), actor, television station owner
 Frantisek Daniel (1926–1996), writer, producer, director
 Victoria "Vicki" Draves (1924–2010), Olympic athlete
 Alice Faye (1915–1998), singer and actress
 Jason David Frank (1973–2022), actor 
 L. Wolfe Gilbert (1886–1970), composer
 Phil Harris (1904–1995), singer, bandleader, and actor
 Billy Herrington (1969–2018), model, pornographic film actor
 Rock Hudson (1925–1985), actor (cenotaph, ashes scattered at sea)
 Dorothy Kamenshek (1925–2010), baseball player
 Francis Lederer (1899–2000), actor
 Gavin MacLeod (1931–2021), actor
 Guy Madison (1922–1996), actor
 George Montgomery (1916–2000), actor
 George Nader (1921–2002), actor (cenotaph is marked here, but his ashes were scattered at sea)
 Papa John Phillips (1935–2001), singer, songwriter, composer
 Michael Rizzitello (1927–2005), mobster
 Harold Robbins (1916–1997), novelist
 Irv Robbins (1917–2008), co-founder of Baskin-Robbins
 Charles 'Buddy' Rogers (1904–1999), actor, musician, humanitarian, third husband of Mary Pickford
 Hank Sanicola (c. 1914–1974), pianist, music publisher, manager and businessman, close friend of Frank Sinatra
 Dinah Shore (1916–1994), singer, actress and talk show host
 Jerry Vale (1930–2014), singer
 Ken Venturi (1931–2013), professional golfer and golf broadcaster, close friend of Frank Sinatra
 Nancy Wilson (1937–2018), singer
 Donald Woods (1906–1998), Canadian actor
 Jane Wyman (1917–2007), actress

See also

 Coachella Valley Public Cemetery – in nearby Indio, California
 Desert Memorial Park – across the street from Forest Lawn
 List of cemeteries in California
 List of cemeteries in Riverside County, California

References

Burial monuments and structures
Cathedral City, California
Cemeteries in Riverside County, California
Mausoleums in the United States
1992 establishments in California